Bang the Drum EP is an EP by Australian rock band INXS. It is an internet-only download exclusive to the iTunes Store.

It was released on 17 August 2004 through record label Island Def Jam, seven years after Michael Hutchence's death. The EP consists of 4 tracks all together, an unreleased song called "Bang the Drum", a bonus track on the limited edition Elegantly Wasted album that was exclusive to Japan and Australia only called "Let It Ride", the other two are live performances of the song "Elegantly Wasted" and "Don't Change", both performed in Aspen, Colorado, in 1997. The songs were made in the Elegantly Wasted era but the two new songs didn't make the final cut of the album in the end (with exception of "Let It Ride", as it was a bonus track on the limited edition of the album).

The performance of "Elegantly Wasted" at Aspen was included on the INXS DVD, Live in Aspen.

Track listing

2004 EPs
INXS EPs
ITunes-exclusive releases